Mohammad Azharuddin (born 8 February 1963) is an Indian politician and a former international cricketer and former captain of India national cricket team. He is the working president of the Telangana Pradesh Congress Committee and was the member of parliament for Moradabad. He played 99 Test matches and 334 One Day Internationals for the Indian national cricket team before his international career came to an end after he was found to have been involved in a match fixing scandal in 2000 and subsequently banned by the Board of Control for Cricket in India for life. In 2012, the Andhra Pradesh High Court lifted the life ban.

In 2009, Azharuddin was elected as a member of the parliament for Moradabad on an Indian National Congress party ticket. In September 2019, Azharuddin was elected as the president of Hyderabad Cricket Association.

Early life and education
Azharuddin was born on 8 February 1963. He was born in Hyderabad to Mohammad Azizuddin and Yousuf Sultana. He attended All Saints High School and graduated from Nizam College, Osmania University with a Bachelor of Commerce degree. Azharuddin married his first wife Naureen in 1987 and they had two sons, Asaduddin and Ayazuddin. Ayazuddin died in a bike accident in 2011. After 9 years of marriage to Naureen, Azharuddin confessed of his relationship with actress Sangita Bijlani whom he said he fell in love with at first sight during an ad shoot in 1985. Subsequently, Azharuddin divorced Naureen and married Bijlani in 1996. They were married for fourteen years before they separated due to Azharuddin's rumoured affairs with multiple people, notably female badminton player Jwala Gutta. Azharuddin married Shannon Marie, his third wife, secretly. He recentlyrevealed his marriage to her.

Cricket career

Azharuddin was known for his wristy strokeplay, much like Indian cricketer Gundappa Viswanath and Pakistani cricketer Zaheer Abbas. He made his debut for the Indian cricket team in Test cricket in 1984 against England at Eden Gardens in Kolkata on 31 December 1984, where he scored 110 in his first innings from 322 deliveries, alongside Ravi Shastri who scored 111, in what was ultimately a drawn match. He subsequently scored two more centuries in his next two Test matches. He scored 121 against England at Lord's in 1990. India was faced with the prospect of a follow-on when Azharuddin came in to bat at number five and scored his hundred off 88 balls in a losing cause. Former England cricketer Vic Marks called it "the most dazzling Test century" he had ever witnessed, in his column for The Observer. In the Second Test in Manchester, Azharuddin made 179 in reply to England's first innings total of 519. Playing attacking cricket, he made 103 runs off 107 balls between lunch and tea on day three, while putting on a 112-run stand with Sachin Tendulkar. Playing his 39th Test, he reached his 10th Test century off 155 balls. The match ended in a draw. Azharuddin ended the series with 426 runs at 85.20. This tally was the highest by an Asian captain in a Test series in England until 2018 when it was broken by Virat Kohli.

Azharuddin scored a record-equalling century for an Indian player in the Second Test at Calcutta during South Africa's India tour in 1996–97. In reply to South Africa's first innings score of 428, Azharuddin brought up his century off 74 deliveries, equalling Kapil Dev's record for the fastest Test century by an India player and fourth overall, in terms of balls faced. Resuming batting on day three on the fall of Javagal Srinath's wicket after retiring hurt the previous evening, Azharuddin reached 50 in 35 balls, then the second fastest for India and scored 91 runs in the first session of play. He struck a 161-run partnership with Anil Kumble for the eighth wicket, another India national record, "hooking and pulling" while dealing with his "weakness against the short-pitched delivery". He particularly attacked Lance Klusener scoring 20 runs off his 14th over. It was his fourth century at this venue and 15th overall. However, India was handed one of its biggest defeats despite another attacking innings by Azharuddin in the fourth innings. Azharuddin followed this up with a second-innings century in the next Test, also the last, of the series. He made an unbeaten 163 and helped his team record their hitherto biggest win in Test history in terms of runs (280). He was named the man of the match, and the series. He aggregated 388 runs for the series at 77.60.

Predominantly a middle order batsman, Azharuddin was known for his attacking brand of cricket and strong slip catching, though continuously struggled against the short ball. Azharuddin played 99 test matches for India and scored 6,215 runs at an average of 45.03, including 22 centuries and 21 half-centuries. His record in One Day Internationals (ODIs) was 9,378 runs from 334 matches at an average of 36.92. As a fielder, he took 156 catches in ODI cricket. Azharuddin started his career with a 110 against England in Kolkata in 1984 and ended with a 102 against South Africa in Banglaore in 2000 thus, becoming the only Indian and the fifth batsman ever to score a century in his first and last Test matches.

Azharuddin was convicted of match fixing in 2000, and banned for life by the Board of Control for Cricket in India (BCCI). During India's 2000 tour of South Africa, a series that was won by India 3–2, Azharuddin scored 112 runs at an average of 28. Other key Indian cricketers whom Azharuddin groomed and also brought into the match-fixing fold displayed similarly dismal performances.

Captaincy
Azharuddin became the captain of the Indian team, succeeding Krishnamachari Srikkanth in 1989. He led the Indian team in 47 Test matches and 174 One Day Internationals. He led the team to victory in 90 ODIs, the highest until surpassed by MS Dhoni on 2 September 2014. His 14 test match wins as captain was a record until it was beaten by Sourav Ganguly, who has 21 test match wins to his name.

Match fixing

Azharuddin was accused of match fixing in the match fixing scandal in 2000. The CBI report states that Azharuddin was the one to introduce then South African Captain Hansie Cronje to the bookies. The International Cricket Council and the BCCI banned Azharuddin for life, based on a report by K Madhavan of the Central Bureau of Investigation.

On 8 November 2012, a divisional bench consisting of Justice Ashutosh Mohunta and Krishna Mohan Reddy of the Andhra Pradesh High Court revoked the ban imposed based on the evidence found. The court concluded that the ban was illegal, although Azharuddin never came back on the field. Azharuddin was 49 when the verdict was announced. He is currently the chairman of Hyderabad cricket board since 2019.

Style
Azharuddin was a middle order batsman of India. He was known for a graceful and fluid batting style. John Woodcock, a cricket writer, said of him, "It's no use asking an Englishman to bat like Mohammad Azharuddin. It would be like expecting a greyhound to win The Derby." Retired cricketer Srinivasaraghavan Venkataraghavan stated that "Azharuddin had the best wrists in the game". Michael Atherton and Angus Fraser said Azharuddin's "genius was second only to Brian Lara among batsmen of their generation."

Novelist and cricket historian Arunabha Sengupta said of Azharuddin:
 Mohammad Azharuddin, was one of the most delightful batsmen to watch and a superb fielder to boot, whose career ended under a cloud of allegations. Azhar was simply magical. Be it batting or fielding, his willow was a wand, his strokes cast a spell and his motion in the field was hypnotic.

Test career statistics

Political career
Azharuddin formally joined the Indian National Congress party on 19 February 2009. He won the 2009 Indian general election from Moradabad in Uttar Pradesh to become a member of parliament of India. Azaharuddin had disclosed his intention to contest the 2019 elections from Secunderabad Parliamentary constituency in 2019.

He is currently holding the position of working president of Telangana Pradesh Congress Committee.

Awards
Azharuddin was awarded the Arjuna Award in 1986 and the Padma Shri, India's fourth-highest civilian award, in recognition of his distinguished contribution in the field of sports, in 1988. He was named one of five Wisden'''s Cricketers of the Year for the year 1991.

Personal life
Azharuddin married Naureen in 1987. In 1996, he divorced her and married actress Sangeeta Bijlani. The marriage reportedly ended in a divorce in 2010 due to Azharuddin's affair with badminton player Jwala Gutta.

He had two sons with his first wife; his younger son, Mohammad Ayazuddin, died in a road accident in 2011. The young cricketer was monitored in an intensive care unit with severe and multiple injuries in kidneys, chest and head. Many VIPs, including the then Andhra Pradesh Chief Minister Kiran Kumar Reddy and other politicians arrived at the hospital to console Azharuddin and his family members. His elder son, Mohammad Asaduddin, married Anam Mirza, the sister of Sania Mirza, in 2019.

In popular culture
A Bollywood film Azhar'', directed by Tony D'Souza, was based on his life. The film featured Emraan Hashmi as Azharuddin, Nargis Fakhri as Sangeeta Bijlani and Prachi Desai as first wife Naureen. It was released on 13 May 2016. The film was criticized for whitewashing his complicity in the match-fixing scandal.

See also
List of international cricket centuries by Mohammad Azharuddin

References

External links

India One Day International cricketers
India Test cricketers
India Test cricket captains
Cricketers who made a century on Test debut
Cricketers at the 1987 Cricket World Cup
Cricketers at the 1992 Cricket World Cup
Cricketers at the 1996 Cricket World Cup
Cricketers at the 1999 Cricket World Cup
Indian cricketers
Derbyshire cricketers
South Zone cricketers
Hyderabad cricketers
Wisden Cricketers of the Year
Politicians from Hyderabad, India
1963 births
Living people
Cricketers from Hyderabad, India
Recipients of the Arjuna Award
India MPs 2009–2014
Osmania University alumni
Indian sportsperson-politicians
Indian Sunni Muslims
Lok Sabha members from Uttar Pradesh
United Progressive Alliance candidates in the 2014 Indian general election
Indian cricket commentators
Recipients of the Padma Shri in sports
People from Moradabad district
Cricketers banned for corruption
Sportspeople banned for life
Alumni of All Saints High School, Hyderabad